Jah Hut may refer to:

 Jah Hut language
 Jah Hut people